IRIS was an English and Irish language magazine which focuses on Irish republicanism, Irish politics, current affairs, history and foreign affairs. The first issue of the magazine was published in 1981. Its headquarters was in Belfast. It ceased publication  2012.

Name
IRIS was named after a republican weekly publication which existed between 1973 and 1980. IRIS is also the Irish language word for journal as well as being the initials of the Irish Republican Information Service.

History
IRIS first appeared in April 1981 and its content focused heavily on The Troubles in Northern Ireland. The magazine was originally intended to be a quarterly  news and current affairs publication aimed at foreign readership. The magazine faced considerable difficulties in first two years but appeared regularly between 1982 and 1993. Gerry Adams described the magazine as being "of central importance of discussion, debate and education to the ongoing development of the republican struggle".  The magazine ceased publication in 1993 but was relaunched in 2005.

The Sinn Féin book shop continued to sell issues of IRIS until 2012, when it appears to have ceased publication.

Editors
Former editors include:
1981–1993 - Unknown
2005–2006 - Jim Slaven
2006–2009 - Seán Mac Brádaigh
2009–2011 - Mícheál Mac Donncha
2011–2012 - Mark Moloney

References

1980s in Irish politics
1990s in Irish politics
2000s in Irish politics
2010s in Irish politics
History magazines
Irish republican magazines
Magazines disestablished in 2012
Magazines established in 1981
Magazines published in the Republic of Ireland
Mass media in Belfast
News magazines published in Europe
Political magazines published in Ireland